Dutch-Bangla Bank Limited (DBBL) is a bank in Bangladesh. DBBL is a scheduled joint venture private commercial bank between local Bangladeshi parties by M Sahabuddin Ahmed (Founder & Chairman) and a Dutch company FMO. DBBL was established under the Bank Companies Act 1991 and incorporated as a public limited company under the Companies Act 1994 in Bangladesh. DBBL commenced formal operation from June 3, 1996. The Bank is listed with the Dhaka Stock Exchange Limited and Chittagong Stock Exchange Limited.

The bank is often colloquially referred to as "DBBL", "Dutch Bangla" and "Dutch Bangla Bank". (DBB. Limited )

ATM network/DBBL Nexus participating banks

DBBL maintains its own network and automation. DBBL has over 4,930 ATM's installed all over Bangladesh, making it the largest network in Bangladesh. On 10 October 2010, DBBL inaugurated its 1000th ATM at the factory premises of the GlaxoSmithKline, Chittagong.

Internet payment 
On 3 June 2010, Dutch Bangla Bank announced internet payments gateway system (Nexus Gateway). Using their Internet Payment Gateway merchants are able to charge their customers' Visa, Masters, DBBL Nexus and Maestro cards online. Presently DBBL has more than 400 e-commerce Merchants.
Mobile Apps: DBBL Recently Launched Nexus Pay App For Their Customers.

Social work 
Dutch Bangla Bank supports social work and is one of the largest private donors in Bangladesh. The bank donates towards social awareness programs, medical and educational fields.

References

External links

 

 Banks of Bangladesh
 Banks established in 1996
 Companies listed on the Dhaka Stock Exchange